Fersah was an Ottoman unit of distance. 

It was based on the distance covered by a horse in normal gait per hour. There were other definitions.

References

Ottoman units of measurement
Units of length